This is a list of the Spanish Singles number-ones of 1979.

Chart history

See also
1979 in music
List of number-one hits (Spain)

References

1979
Spain Singles
Number-one singles